The Art Tatum - Ben Webster Quartet is an album by pianist Art Tatum and saxophonist Ben Webster featuring tracks recorded in 1956 by the Verve label and released as a 12-inch LP in 1958. The album was reissued as The Tatum Group Masterpieces, Volume Eight by Pablo in 1975.

Reception

Allmusic's review by William Ruhlmann states: "Tatum never subsides to simple comping; he just keeps soloing away under Webster's rich tenor tones until Webster stops playing, and then keeps on to the end. So, although this is billed as a group effort, it's not a group of equals or really one in which the players are cooperating with each other. Tatum might as well be playing solo, since he takes very little account of what's happening around him. Granz makes it work by varying the volume of the different instruments in the mix, and the result is a fascinating study in contrasts".

The Penguin Guide to Jazz Recordings selected the reissue as part of its suggested “core collection” of essential recordings.

Track listing
 "All the Things You Are" (Jerome Kern, Oscar Hammerstein II) – 7:12
 "My One and Only Love" (Guy Wood, Robert Mellin) – 6:15
 "My Ideal" (Newell Chase, Leo Robin, Richard A. Whiting) – 7:14
 "Gone with the Wind" (Allie Wrubel, Herb Magidson) – 4:45
 "Have You Met Miss Jones?" (Richard Rodgers, Lorenz Hart) – 4:46
 "Night and Day" (Cole Porter) – 5:27
 "Where or When" (Rogers, Hart) – 6:24

Personnel 
Art Tatum – piano
Ben Webster – tenor saxophone 
Red Callender – bass
Bill Douglass – drums

References 

1958 albums
Ben Webster albums
Art Tatum albums
Albums produced by Norman Granz
Verve Records albums